Tilly of Bloomsbury is a 1931 British comedy film directed by Jack Raymond and starring Sydney Howard, Phyllis Konstam, Richard Bird and Edward Chapman. It is based on the play Tilly of Bloomsbury by Ian Hay, previously adapted into a 1921 silent film of the same title It was shot at the Elstree Studios outside London. The film's sets were designed by the art director Clifford Pember. The screenplay concerns a woman who falls in love with an aristocrat.

Premise
A young woman falls in love with an aristocrat and tries to convince his parents that she is herself wealthy.

Cast
 Sydney Howard as Samuel Stillbottle 
 Phyllis Konstam as Tilly Welwyn 
 Richard Bird as Dick Mainwaring 
 Edward Chapman as Percy Welwyn 
 Ellie Jeffreys as Lady Marion Mainwaring 
 Marie Wright as Mrs. Banks 
 Mabel Russell as Mrs. Welwyn 
 H. R. Hignett as Lucius Welwyn 
 Ena Grossmith as Amelia Welwyn 
 Sebastian Smith as Abel Mainwaring 
 Leila Page as Sylvia 
 Olwen Roose as Constance Damery 
 T. Gordon Blythe as Metha Ram

References

Bibliography
 Low, Rachael. Filmmaking in 1930s Britain. George Allen & Unwin, 1985.
 Wood, Linda. British Films, 1927-1939. British Film Institute, 1986.

External links
 

1931 films
British comedy films
1931 comedy films
1930s English-language films
Films directed by Jack Raymond
British films based on plays
Films based on works by Ian Hay
Films set in London
British black-and-white films
Films shot at Imperial Studios, Elstree
1930s British films